This Left Feels Right Live is the third of Bon Jovi's live concert videos. Filmed at Atlantic City, New Jersey, this features the band's performance at the Borgata on November 14 and 15, 2003. The DVD was directed by Tony Bongiovi (Anthony Michael Bongiovi) - Jon's younger brother, not his cousin of the same name.

Track listing
Love for Sale
You Give Love a Bad Name*
Wanted Dead or Alive*
Livin' on a Prayer*
It's My Life*
Misunderstood
Lay Your Hands on Me*
Someday I'll Be Saturday Night
Last Man Standing
Sylvia's Mother
Everyday*
Bad Medicine*
Bed of Roses*
Born to Be My Baby*
Keep the Faith*
Joey
Thief of Hearts
I'll Be There for You*
Always*
Blood on Blood

[*]: New reconstructed version from This Left Feels Right.

Additional material
The DVD includes a 30-minute documentary entitled "Everyday with Bon Jovi", which shows behind the scenes footage from the Atlantic City concert. The DVD also contains outtakes and production credits.

Limited Edition Bonus Disc
The Bonus DVD contains an interactive Poker game with the band, a multi camera angle "Directors view" of three songs from the Atlantic City concert, an exclusive interview with the band, six songs from Bon Jovi's June 28, 2003 concert in Hyde Park, London, and a photo gallery.

Directors View
Love for Sale
I'll Be There for You
Lay Your Hands on Me

Hyde Park
Lay Your Hands on Me
Raise Your Hands
Captain Crash & The Beauty Queen From Mars
Blood on Blood
Bounce
Everyday

Personnel
Bon Jovi
Jon Bon Jovi – lead vocals, acoustic rhythm guitar
Richie Sambora – acoustic lead guitar, backing vocals
David Bryan – keyboards, backing vocals
Tico Torres – drums, percussion

Additional musicians
Hugh McDonald – acoustic bass guitar, backing vocals
Bobby Bandiera – acoustic rhythm guitar, backing vocals
Jeff Kazee – keyboards, backing vocals
Everett Bradley –  percussion, backing vocals

Charts

Certifications

References

Bon Jovi video albums
2004 video albums
Live video albums
2004 live albums